Sepak takraw was contested at the 2006 Asian Games in Doha, Qatar by both men and women. Team, Regu, and Doubles competitions are all involved in the Sepak takraw competition, with all games taking place at Al-Sadd Indoor Hall.

Schedule

Medalists

Men

Women

Medal table

Participating nations
A total of 171 athletes from 11 nations competed in sepak takraw at the 2006 Asian Games:

References

External links
  from the 2006 Asian Games website

 
2006 Asian Games events
2006